Jean-François Bonhème (born 12 July 1949) is a French male former track and field athlete who competed in the long jump.

Born in Paris, he was a member of Paris Université Club and trained under Hugues Raffin-Peyloz. In other international competitions, he won at the 1973 European Cup Semi Final and was runner-up at the Universiade that same year.

He was a five-time national champion in the long jump, winning three titles at the French Athletics Championships and a further two at the French Indoor Athletics Championships.

International competitions

National titles
French Athletics Championships
Long jump: 1973, 1974, 1979
French Indoor Athletics Championships
Long jump: 1972, 1974

References

External links

Living people
1949 births
Athletes from Paris
French male long jumpers
Universiade medalists in athletics (track and field)
Universiade silver medalists for France
Medalists at the 1973 Summer Universiade
Athletes (track and field) at the 1975 Mediterranean Games
Mediterranean Games competitors for France